Zoilo Sánchez de Ocańa y Vieitiz (27 June 1831, Palencia – 1907, Cartagena) was a Spanish admiral, the first Chief of Staff of the Spanish Navy, serving from 14 July 1895 to 19 March 1896. As of 1869, he was a frigate captain on the war and navy section of the State Council. He was also made a Commander of the Order of Charles III in 1865, and in 1893 he had been awarded the Order of Naval Merit. It is likely that he was retired or died by the time the Spanish–American War broke out in 1898, as he was not present at a meeting of senior Spanish naval officers on 23 April 1898 that decided to send Admiral Pascual Cervera's squadron to Cuba.

References

1831 births
1907 deaths
Chiefs of Staff of the Navy (Spain)
Crosses of Naval Merit
People from Palencia
Spanish admirals